The 2015–16 Southampton F.C. season was the club's 17th season in the Premier League and their 39th in the top division of English football. It was also the club's first season in a European competition since 2003–04. Southampton finished the season in sixth place in the Premier League, having won 18, drawn 9 and lost 11 of their 38 matches. This result is the highest club finish in the Premier League and the highest Premier League points total (63) in the club's history. Aside from the league, the club was eliminated from the third round of the FA Cup, the fifth round of the League Cup, and the qualifying play-off round of the UEFA Europa League.

Following the end of the 2014–15 campaign, Southampton released seven first team players. The club also sold right-back Nathaniel Clyne to Liverpool, midfielder Morgan Schneiderlin to Manchester United, and striker Emmanuel Mayuka to French side Metz. Three players were sent out on season-long loans to Football League sides – Sam Gallagher to Milton Keynes Dons, Jack Stephens to Middlesbrough, and Jordan Turnbull to Swindon Town – while Jason McCarthy and Lloyd Isgrove were sent out on loans until January.

In the summer transfer window, the Saints made seven full signings – striker Juanmi from Málaga, right-backs Cédric Soares and Cuco Martina from Sporting CP and FC Twente, respectively, midfielder Jordy Clasie from Feyenoord, defensive midfielder Oriol Romeu from Chelsea, goalkeeper Harry Lewis from Shrewsbury Town, and centre-back Virgil van Dijk from Celtic. The club also brought in Fulham goalkeeper Maarten Stekelenburg and Queens Park Rangers centre-back Steven Caulker on season-long loans.

In January 2016, the club signed striker Charlie Austin from Queens Park Rangers. Caulker's loan agreement was cut short to allow him to move to Liverpool, while both Gallagher and Stephens returned to Southampton early. Also loaned out were Sam McQueen to Southend United, Gastón Ramírez to Middlesbrough, Ryan Seager to Crewe Alexandra, and Stephens to Coventry City, while Isgrove's loan spell at Barnsley was extended until the end of the season. In addition, young goalkeeper Harry Isted was released.

Senegalese forward Sadio Mané finished the 2015–16 season as Southampton's top scorer, with 15 goals in all competitions; Mané and Italian striker Graziano Pellè finished as joint top scorers in the Premier League, with 11 goals each. Irish striker Shane Long won the fan-voted Southampton F.C. Player of the Season award presented by the Southern Daily Echo, while Dutch defender Virgil van Dijk won the Fans' and Players' Player of the Season awards presented by the club. Saints manager Ronald Koeman won the Premier League Manager of the Month award in January 2016, while goalkeeper Fraser Forster won the Premier League Player of the Month award in February 2016.

Pre-season

Southampton began their pre-season preparations in Austria with a friendly against German side RB Leipzig on 8 July 2015, which they lost 5–4. New signings Juanmi and Cédric Soares scored their first goals for the club, while Jay Rodriguez returned from a long-term injury to strike twice in the game. Three days later, the club competed in the Audi Quattro Cup semi-final against Spanish club Valencia, losing 1–0 thanks to a goal scored by Pablo Piatti. Both Sadio Mané and José Fonte hit the crossbar during the game, but Valencia advanced to the final. In the third-place playoff match against hosts Red Bull Salzburg, the Saints lost 2–0, thus finishing fourth in the tournament.

On 15 July, Southampton faced Brighton & Hove Albion in a private match at the Staplewood training ground. The Saints won the game 1–0, with Sam McQueen scoring the only goal in the final minute. Three days later, they beat Dutch club FC Groningen 3–0 thanks to goals from captain Fonte, Mané and Graziano Pellè. They later beat Quick '20 10–0 on 21 July, with goals including hat-tricks from Pellè and Rodriguez. The Saints won their last match in the Netherlands on 23 July, beating Feyenoord 3–0 with goals from Pellè, Maya Yoshida and Juanmi.

The club finished their pre-season preparations at St Mary's Stadium against Spanish side RCD Espanyol on 2 August. The hosts went 1–0 down early on through a goal by Salva Sevilla, but equalised through Rodriguez in the last five minutes to finish the game 1–1.

Premier League

August–October 2015

Southampton began their 2015–16 Premier League campaign at Newcastle United, drawing 2–2. Graziano Pellè opened the scoring for the Saints, before Papiss Cissé equalised for the hosts just before half-time. Newcastle scored again shortly after the break through Georginio Wijnaldum, but Shane Long equalised for the visitors in the 79th minute. The following week they lost 3–0 at home to Everton, thanks to two goals from Romelu Lukaku and one from Ross Barkley. The slow start to the season continued, as the Saints drew with recently promoted Watford on 23 August, before they won their first game on at the end of the month by beating Norwich City 3–0. Goals came from Pellè and two from Dušan Tadić.

Two weeks later, Southampton travelled to face West Bromwich Albion, which ended in another goalless draw. The club next faced Manchester United at St Mary's Stadium on 20 September, losing 3–2 to drop to 16th in the league. Pellè opened the scoring early on, before Anthony Martial equalised for the visitors shortly before half-time. A second goal from Pellè was not enough for the Saints to beat United, who scored two more through a Martial second and a Juan Mata winner. The club picked up their second win of the season against Swansea City on 26 September, winning 3–1 with goals from Virgil van Dijk (his first for the club), Tadić and Sadio Mané.

On 3 October, the Saints travelled to face Premier League champions Chelsea, picking up their third win of the season. The hosts took an early lead through Willian, before midfielder Steven Davis equalised just before half-time. Sadio Mané took advantage of a defensive error to put Southampton in the lead on 60 minutes, before Graziano Pellè scored his fifth of the campaign to make it 3–1 for the visitors. On 17 October, the team hosted Leicester City, drawing 2–2 and moving up to eighth in the table. Southampton scored both goals in the first half, courtesy of defenders José Fonte and Virgil van Dijk, before Jamie Vardy scored two goals in the final 30 minutes of the match to give Leicester a point. On 25 October, Southampton travelled at Anfield to face Liverpool. A goal from Sadio Mané with four minutes left of regulation time cancelled out a Christian Benteke strike and resulted in a 1–1 draw.

November–December 2015
To begin November, Southampton hosted local rivals AFC Bournemouth in the first top-flight meeting between the two South Coast sides. Two first half goals in quick succession from Steven Davis and Graziano Pellè secured the 2–0 win, moving Southampton up in the table to seventh. The following week, the Saints traveled north to face Sunderland, where a Dušan Tadić penalty in the 69th minute (after Ryan Bertrand was taken down by Yann M'Vila) ensured the team claimed all three points, after strong efforts from Steven Davis and José Fonte were cleared from the line. After a week's break, Southampton hosted Stoke City on 21 November but lost 1–0. With only one shot on target, the Saints could not cancel out the early goal from Bojan, slipping down to eighth in the table. Southampton picked up a second consecutive loss the following week against title contenders Manchester City, who won relatively comfortably thanks to goals from Kevin De Bruyne, Fabian Delph and Aleksandar Kolarov. Shane Long scored a consolation for the visitors.

Southampton's first game in December against Aston Villa ended in a 1–1 draw to see the Saints slip further down the table into 12th. Joleon Lescott opened for Villa on the verge of half time, before Oriol Romeu equalised for the hosts later in the game. The following week, they went a fourth game without a win as they lost 1–0 to Crystal Palace. Yohan Cabaye scored the only goal of the game shortly before the break, with the Saints failing to pressurise Palace for long periods of the match. The Saints lost another game the following week at home to Tottenham Hotspur, who won 2–0 thanks to goals from Harry Kane and Dele Alli, both within the last five minutes of the first half.

On Boxing Day the Saints beat second-placed Arsenal 4–0 at St Mary's. Cuco Martina opened the scoring on his first league start for the club, Shane Long scored the second ten minutes after half time, captain José Fonte scored his second of the season and Long scored a second in injury time to complete the win. Two days later, Southampton lost 2–1 at West Ham United, missing out on the chance to move up to ninth in the table. The Saints opened the scoring within 15 minutes thanks to a Carl Jenkinson own goal, but former Southampton loanee Michail Antonio and Andy Carroll scored for the hosts in the final third of the game to pick up the win.

January–February 2016

In their first game of 2016, Southampton lost 1–0 to Norwich City, dropping to 13th in the Premier League table. Alexander Tettey scored the only goal of the match late in the second half, shortly after Victor Wanyama was sent off for the Saints. On 13 January, Southampton beat Watford 2–0 at home to move back up to 12th in the table. Shane Long headed in the opener in the 17th minute from a Matt Targett delivery, before substitute Dušan Tadić secured the win in the second half with a close range effort. Three days later the Saints beat West Brom 3–0 with two goals from James Ward-Prowse and one from Dušan Tadić to move up to tenth in the table. The following week, Southampton picked up their third consecutive league win, over Manchester United at Old Trafford. The only goal in the game came just before full-time courtesy of new signing Charlie Austin.

On 2 February, Southampton travelled to the Emirates Stadium to face Arsenal, which ended in a goalless draw. Goalkeeper Fraser Forster was named the man of the match, after making a string of impressive saves to keep a clean sheet for the visitors. The club beat West Ham 1–0 later in the week, extending their run of consecutive clean sheets to five games, with defender Maya Yoshida scoring the only goal of the game within the first ten minutes. On 13 February, Southampton travelled to face Swansea, winning 1–0 and advancing to sixth in the Premier League table. Shane Long scored the only goal of the game in the second half, levelling Graziano Pellè as the season's top scorer. Two weeks later, the Saints lost their first game in almost two months when Chelsea won 2–1 at St Mary's. Shane Long opened the scoring in the first half, before Cesc Fàbregas and Branislav Ivanović scored late on for the win.

March–May 2016

On 1 March, Southampton lost 2–0 to local rivals AFC Bournemouth. Charlie Austin had the best chance for the Saints, but the Cherries won through goals from Steve Cook and Benik Afobe. Later in the week, the Saints hosted Sunderland and drew 1–1. Captain José Fonte was sent off during the game for a foul, before Jermain Defoe put the visitors ahead in the 85th minute. During injury time, Virgil van Dijk scored his third goal of the season to seal a point for the hosts. The Saints returned to winning ways the following week, beating Stoke to move up to seventh in the league. Graziano Pellè scored a brace in the first half to put Southampton ahead, and although Marko Arnautović brought one back for the hosts, they were unable to turn the game in their favour and it finished 2–1. Sadio Mané was sent off late in the game, although the red card was quickly overturned on appeal.

On 20 March, Southampton came from two goals down to beat Liverpool at home and remain seventh in the league. The visitors went 2–0 up within the first 25 minutes through Philippe Coutinho and Daniel Sturridge, before a third goal from Joe Allen was disallowed for offside in the 33rd minute. Shortly after the break, substitute Sadio Mané saw a penalty saved by Simon Mignolet, before the striker scored a first for the hosts. in the 64th minute. In the final ten minutes, the Saints scored two in three minutes through Graziano Pellè and Mané to seal victory. Two weeks later, the Saints lost 1–0 to league leaders Leicester. Wes Morgan scored the only goal of the game late in the first half to give Southampton their first loss in four matches. On 9 April, the club beat Newcastle 3–1 at home. Shane Long opened the scoring in the fourth minute, Graziano Pellè doubled the lead before half time, Victor Wanyama scored the third ten minutes after the break, and Andros Townsend scored for the visitors ten minutes later.

Southampton travelled to face Everton on 16 April, which ended in a 1–1 draw. After a goalless first half, Ramiro Funes Mori opened the scoring for the hosts in the 68th minute, before Sadio Mané equalised for the Saints less than ten minutes later. The following week, Southampton beat Aston Villa at Villa Park 4–2. Shane Long and Dušan Tadić put the Saints two up in the first half, although Ashley Westwood pulled one back for the hosts on the stroke of half time. Tadić and Westwood each scored their second goals after the break, before Sadio Mané secured the win for the visitors in injury time. On 1 May, Southampton beat Manchester City 4–2 at home to move up to seventh in the league table. Shane Long opened the scoring for the hosts, before Sadio Mané scored a hat trick to make it four. Kelechi Iheanacho scored both of the goals for the visitors. The following week, Southampton beat Tottenham 2–1, with both goals being scored by Steven Davis.

On 15 May 2016, in their final game of the season, Southampton beat Crystal Palace 4–1 at St Mary's Stadium. Sadio Mané opened the scoring with his 15th goal in all competitions just before half time to put the Saints 1–0 at the break. Graziano Pellè came on as a substitute in the second half and doubled the scoreline in the 61st minute, before former Southampton midfielder Jason Puncheon pulled one back for Palace. Defender Ryan Bertrand scored his only goal of the season in a penalty kick in the 75th minute, before Steven Davis finished the scoring in the final five minutes of normal time to complete the win. The win, as well as results in other matches, saw Southampton move up to fifth in the Premier League table and secure a return to the UEFA Europa League the following season. Manchester United later won their final rescheduled fixture 3–1 against AFC Bournemouth at Old Trafford two days, finalising Southampton's league position for the 2015–16 Premier League season at a club-record sixth.

League table

Results summary

Results by matchday

Matches

FA Cup
Crystal Palace (9 January 2016)
In the third round of the 2015–16 FA Cup, Southampton hosted fellow Premier League side Crystal Palace on 9 January 2016, losing the game 2–1 to exit the tournament. Joel Ward opened the scoring for the visitors in the 29th minute to give Palace a 1–0 lead at half-time. Oriol Romeu scored for the Saints shortly after the break, but Wilfried Zaha scored a winner in the 68th minute to eliminate Southampton from the cup.

League Cup
Milton Keynes Dons (23 September 2015)
Southampton was drawn in the third round of the 2015–16 League Cup against Championship side Milton Keynes Dons. The Saints won the match easily 6–0. Jay Rodriguez opened the scoring in the fifth minute, Sadio Mané doubled the lead five minutes later, and later scored a second in the 25th minute to put Southampton 3–0 up by half-time. After the break, Rodriguez scored a second from a penalty, before Shane Long scored two within seven minutes of one another to increase the visitors' tally to six.

Aston Villa (28 October 2015)
In the fourth round, Southampton drew Premier League side Aston Villa at home. Two second half goals from Maya Yoshida in the 51st minute and Graziano Pellè in the 77th minute were enough to defeat caretaker manager Kevin MacDonald's side, despite an injury time penalty from Scott Sinclair that made the final score 2–1.

Liverpool (2 December 2015)
For the fifth round, Premier League side Liverpool visited St Mary's Stadium. After a quick opening goal from Sadio Mané in the first minute, Jürgen Klopp's side scored three goals in the first half and three goals in the second half with a brace from Daniel Sturridge, a hat-trick by Divock Origi and one from Jordon Ibe.

UEFA Europa League
Vitesse (30 July and 6 August 2015)
Southampton entered the 2015–16 UEFA Europa League in the third qualifying round. Their first game took place against Dutch side Vitesse on 30 July 2015, which the Saints won 3–0 at St Mary's Stadium. Graziano Pellè found the net first in the 36th minute to put Southampton one up, before Dušan Tadić scored a penalty just before half time. Substitute Shane Long finished the scoring late in the second half to win the game for the home side. In the second leg Southampton won 2–0, therefore advancing to the play-off round 5–0 on aggregate. Pellè scored again to put the Saints up in the fourth minute, with Sadio Mané doubling his side's lead just a minute before the end of the match.

Midtjylland (20 and 27 August 2015)
In the qualifying play-off round, Southampton faced Midtjylland. In the first leg the Saints drew 1–1 with the Danish champions, with Jay Rodriguez equalising after Tim Sparv's opener on the stroke of half-time. In the second leg, Midtjylland striker Morten Rasmussen scored the only goal of the game to ensure the Danish side won 2–1 on aggregate to eliminate Southampton from the competition.

Squad statistics

Most appearances

Top goalscorers

Transfers

References

Southampton F.C. seasons
Southampton